Govatos'/McVey Building is a historic commercial building located at Wilmington, New Castle County, Delaware. It was built in 1895, and is a three-story, rectangular plan building of bearing wall brick construction.  During the first half of the 20th century, it was converted into a restaurant, candy factory/shop by removing original storefronts
along East Eighth Street.  The building features large half-hexagonal pedimented copper bays on the second and third stories in the Queen Anne style. The building has housed Govatos Chocolates since 1910–1918.  Govatos is the last candy making firm in Wilmington and still makes hand-dipped candy by the same method as in 1894.

It was added to the National Register of Historic Places in 1985.

References

External links
Govatos Chocolates website

Commercial buildings on the National Register of Historic Places in Delaware
Queen Anne architecture in Delaware
Commercial buildings completed in 1895
Buildings and structures in Wilmington, Delaware
National Register of Historic Places in Wilmington, Delaware